Ince may refer to:
Ince, Cheshire, a village in Cheshire, UK
Ince-in-Makerfield in the Metropolitan Borough of Wigan, UK
Ince (UK Parliament constituency), a former constituency covering Ince-in-Makerfield
Ince (ward), an electoral ward covering Ince-in-Makerfield
Ince Blundell, a village in Merseyside, UK
Ince Castle, a manor house in Cornwall, UK
İncə, Goychay, Azerbaijan
İncə, Shaki, Azerbaijan
 Ince & Co, international law firm

See also
 Ince (surname) for people with the surname 'Ince'